Jian-Min Yuan may refer to:
Jian-Min Yuan (epidemiologist), Chinese cancer epidemiologist
Jian-Min Yuan (physicist) (born 1944), Taiwanese physicist